Pholcus velitchkovskyi is a cellar spider species found in Russia, Ukraine and Iran.

See also 
 List of Pholcidae species

References

External links 

Pholcidae
Spiders of Europe
Spiders of Asia
Fauna of Iran
Spiders described in 1913